Ouafae Nachâ is a Moroccan former footballer who played as a midfielder. She has been a member of the Morocco women's national team.

Club career
Nachâ has played for CA Khénifra in Morocco and for Abu Dhabi Country Club in the United Arab Emirates.

International career
Nachâ capped for Morocco at senior level on 8 March 2008 in a 0–6 friendly home lost to France.

See also
 List of Morocco women's international footballers

References

External links

Living people
Moroccan women's footballers
Women's association football midfielders
Abu Dhabi Country Club players
Morocco women's international footballers
Moroccan expatriate footballers
Moroccan expatriate sportspeople in the United Arab Emirates
Expatriate women's footballers in the United Arab Emirates
Emirati women's footballers
United Arab Emirates women's international footballers
Dual internationalists (women's football)
Year of birth missing (living people)